Three ships of the French Navy have borne the name Algésiras in honour of the Battle of Algeciras:

 , a 74-gun ship of the line
 , a 74-gun ship of the line
 , a swift 90-gun ship of the line, lead ship of Algésiras-class ship of the line

French Navy ship names